Grant Neary is an American baseball coach who is the current head baseball coach of the Saint Peter's Peacocks. He was also the head baseball coach of the CCNY Beavers (2011) and McDaniel Green Terror (2019–2020). Neary was a 1st Team All-State Selection at Bridgewater-Raritan High School before multiple shoulder injuries and subsequent surgeries ended his college playing career.

Coaching career
On September 9, 2022, Neary was promoted from assistant coach to head coach of the Saint Peter's Peacocks.

Head coaching record

References

Living people
CCNY Beavers baseball coaches
Iona Gaels baseball coaches
McDaniel Green Terror baseball coaches
NJIT Highlanders baseball coaches
Saint Peter's Peacocks baseball coaches
Year of birth missing (living people)